Tiga Abdul (The Three Abduls) is a 1964 Malaysian comedy film directed by and starring Malaysian silver-screen icon P. Ramlee. It tells the story of three brothers who are caught in a web of trickery set by the cunning Sadiq Segaraga who uses his three daughters to fleece the three brothers of all their wealth. The movie is a tribute to traditional folktales with a moral set into the story and is set in a fictional Middle Eastern country named Isketambola, loosely based on Istanbul, Turkey. It was the last film to be directed by P. Ramlee in Singapore before he moved to his new workplace in Merdeka Studios, Kuala Lumpur in 1965.

Plot

Ismet Ulam Raja is a wealthy businessman with three sons, Abdul Wahab, Abdul Wahib and Abdul Wahub. Abdul Wahab and Abdul Wahib are selfish and money-minded, running their individual businesses to success. Abdul Wahub, on the other hand, enjoys a simple life and owns a small music shop. When Ismet Ulam Raja has a heart attack on his birthday, Abdul Wahab and Abdul Wahib start plotting out how much wealth they are set to gain when their father dies. Abdul Wahub is appalled at their behaviour and tries to get their father to go to the hospital, although Ismet Ulam Raja is strongly against hospitals. Their father dies at home, and the two elder brothers immediately distribute their late father's vast wealth among the two of them while Abdul Wahub only inherits their father's house. Although Abdul Wahub is upset at this injustice, he accepts it as he is the youngest brother, and returns to his simple music business.

Sadiq Segaraga, a friend of the late Ismet Ulam Raja, has also set his eyes on the vast wealth that once belonged to his friend. He orders his three beautiful daughters, Hamidah, Rafidah and Ghasidah, to woo the three Abduls. Hamidah is successful in wooing Abdul Wahab and Rafidah is successful in wooing Abdul Wahib, but Ghasidah and Abdul Wahub only argue with each other on sight.

The two elder Abduls meet Sadiq Segaraga to ask for his two daughters' hands in marriage. Sadiq agrees, on the condition that they sign a contract written by him and his lawyer, Kassim Patalon. The contract states that if the Abduls lose their temper at any moment during their marriage, all the wealth they own will go to Sadiq and the Abduls will be sold as slaves. Although they are suspicious of the contract, they agree to sign it. After the marriage, Abdul Wahab and Abdul Wahib move into Sadiq's home, where they are told they are not allowed to eat their food, only smell it, and they are to sleep in the stables, not in their wives' rooms. The two Abduls lose their temper at these conditions, and Sadiq reveals the contract, claiming all their wealth and sells the two men as slaves.

Abdul Wahub sees his brothers being sold in the marketplace, but cannot do anything. That night, his father's spirit appears to him in a dream, telling him to meet a man named Sulaiman Akh-laken. Abdul Wahub does as he's instructed and it turns out that Sulaiman Akh-laken is Ismet Ulam Raja's lawyer who managed Ismet's overseas properties, which are now passed on to Abdul Wahub. Abdul Wahub discovers that he is several times richer than his two elder brothers combined. Using this knowledge, he starts his plan by meeting Sadiq Segaraga and asking for Ghasidah's hand in marriage. At first, Sadiq refused to accept Abdul Wahub's proposal because he thinks Abdul Wahub is poorer than his brothers, but after Abdul Wahub shows proof of his wealth, immediately Sadiq agrees. Sadiq shows Abdul Wahub the same contract he'd presented to his elder brothers, and Abdul Wahub says that he'll sign it, on the condition that Sadiq signs another contract. The second contract states that if Sadiq loses his temper, then Abdul Wahub will claim all his wealth and sell Sadiq as a slave.

Abdul Wahub and Ghasidah are married, although they supposedly still hate each other. Abdul Wahub arrives at Sadiq's home and is told the same things his brothers were told but, being prepared, he reacts to all the conditions with ease. The following days, Abdul Wahub counters Sadiq's trickery by avoiding Ghasidah, going on supposed dinner dates with another woman and giving away all the things in Sadiq's shop to the poor. Each time, Sadiq almost loses his temper, but his lawyer Kassim Patalon reminds him about the contract he signed.

Ghasidah then confronts Abdul Wahub, asking him whether he's really having an affair with another woman. At first, Abdul Wahub pretends it is true. But it is later revealed that it was just pretend, and that he is actually in love with Ghasidah, and Ghasidah is in love with him.

Sadiq Segaraga finally loses his temper when Abdul Wahub invites the people of the town into Sadiq's house to take away anything they want. When Sadiq admits that he is truly angry, Abdul Wahub reveals the contract, taking everything that Sadiq owns and selling Sadiq, Kassim Patalon, Rafidah and Hamidah as slaves in the market.

After a while, Abdul Wahub buys Abdul Wahab and Abdul Wahib (who have been bought by a merchant), along with Sadiq, Rafidah and Hamidah,(except for Kassim Patalon, leaving him alone) and brings all of them back to the house that was once the only heirloom that Abdul Wahub inherited from Ismet Ulam Raja. After a tearful speech, Abdul Wahub apologises to everyone for his doing, and undoes the contracts that bound them as slaves. At the end of the film, all those who spent their time as slaves learned their lesson.

Cast and characters

Main
 P. Ramlee as Abdul Wahub Ulam Raja, the youngest of three Ismet's sons, owner of a shop selling musical instruments and records.
 Haji Mahadi as Abdul Wahab Ulam Raja, the eldest of three Ismet's sons, owner of a shop selling birds.
 S. Kadarisman as Abdul Wahib Ulam Raja, the second son of Ismet Ulam Raja, owner of a carving workshop.
 Sarimah as Ghasidah Segaraga, the youngest of three Sadiq's daughters.
 Mariani as Hamidah Segaraga, the eldest of three Sadiq's daughters.
 Dayang Sofia as Rafidah Segaraga, the second daughter of Sadiq Segaraga.

Supporting casts
 Ahmad Nisfu as Sadiq Segaraga, owner of an antique shop, father of Hamidah, Rafidah and Ghasidah.
 Salleh Kamil as Kassim Patalon, Sadiq's accomplice attorney cum adviser.
 S. Shamsuddin as the storyteller.
 H. M. Busra as the slave trader.
 M. Babjan as Ismet Ulam Raja, the richest magnate in Isketambola, owner of various enterprises, father of the three Abduls.
 Nyong Ismail as Hussain Lempoyang, a camel dealer from Cairo.
 Ahmad Sabri as Suleiman Akhlaken, Ismet Ulam Raja's attorney.
 S. Sudarmaji as a person looking for bird's dung to be used as fertiliser.
 Udo Omar as the orphanage's teacher.

Cameos
 Saloma as herself. She appears at the beginning of the film, singing the title song.
 Murni Sarawak (uncredited) as Fatima Hatem Thai, deceased mother of the three Abduls, wife of Ismet Ulam Raja. Only her portrait appears in the film.

Songs
 Bunyi Guitar (The Sound of the Guitar) - Performed by P. Ramlee
 Tolong Kami, Bantu Kami (Oh Please Help Us) - Performed by P. Ramlee
 Sedangkan Lidah Lagi Tergigit (Even the Tongue Gets Bitten) - Performed by P. Ramlee and Saloma
 Allah Selamatkan Kamu (May Allah Save You) - Performed by Ahmad Nisfu

See also
 List of P. Ramlee films
 P. Ramlee

References

External links
 Tiga Abdul at FilemKita.com
 

1964 films
Malay-language films
1964 musical comedy films
Films directed by P. Ramlee
Malaysian black-and-white films
Singaporean black-and-white films
Films with screenplays by P. Ramlee
Films scored by P. Ramlee
Malay Film Productions films
Films set in Asia
Films shot in Singapore